Dhopakandi Union is a union of Gopalpur Upazila, Tangail District, Bangladesh. It is situated at 48 km north of Tangail.

Demographics

According to Population Census 2011 performed by Bangladesh Bureau of Statistics, The total population of Dhopakandi union is 25000. There are 6707 households in total.

Education

The literacy rate of Dhopakandi Union is 45.5% (Male-47.4%, Female-43.6%).

See also
 Union Councils of Tangail District

References

Populated places in Dhaka Division
Populated places in Tangail District
Unions of Gopalpur Upazila